Pictures is the eighth studio album by American country music artist John Michael Montgomery. It was also his first full-length album for Warner Bros. Records, following the closure of Atlantic Records' country division in 2001. The track "'Til Nothing Comes Between Us", the first single, was a top 20 hit on the Hot Country Songs chart in 2002. "Four Wheel Drive" and "Country Thang" were also released as singles, although neither reached the top 40. "It Goes Like This" is a collaboration with the band Sixwire, who at the time were also on Warner Bros. Records. Their lead singer, Steve Mandile, co-wrote the track.

Track listing

Personnel
 Mike Brignardello - bass guitar
 Eric Darken - percussion
 Chip Davis - background vocals
 Paul Franklin - lap steel guitar, pedal steel guitar
 Kenny Greenberg - electric guitar
 Steve Mandile - acoustic guitar, electric guitar
 Brent Mason - electric guitar
 John Michael Montgomery - lead vocals
 Gordon Mote - piano, strings
 Steve Nathan - Hammond B-3 organ, piano, synthesizer, Wurlitzer
 John Wesley Ryles - background vocals
 Sixwire - background vocals on "It Goes Like This"
 Michael Spriggs - acoustic guitar
 Lonnie Wilson - drums, background vocals
 Curtis Young - background vocals

Chart performance

References

2002 albums
John Michael Montgomery albums
Albums produced by Scott Hendricks
Warner Records albums